Akwáwa is a Tupi–Guarani dialect cluster spoken in Pará in western Brazil.

Dialects
There are three distinct dialects:
Asuriní (of Tocantins or Trocará), or Akwawa
Suruí (of Tocantins or Pará), or Akewara
Parakanã, Awaeté

Both the name Asuriní and Suruí are used for related peoples and their languages: Suruí of Jiparaná, Suruí of Rondônia, Asuriní of Xingú, etc.

Phonology 
The following is the Parakanã dialect:

Vowels 

 Vowel sounds are realized as nasalized when preceding nasal consonants. 
 /e/ can also be heard as  when in stressed position.
 /ɨ/ can also be heard as  when preceding a vowel.
 /a/ can be heard as back  when in word-final position. In its nasal form, it is heard as back .
 /o/ can be heard as  when in unstressed position.

Consonants 

 /β/ can also be heard as a glide .
 /tʃ/ can be realized as a glide  in final position, and as voiced  in intervocalic positions.

Notes

Tupi–Guarani languages
Languages of Brazil